Aaron Lynch may refer to:
Aaron Lynch (writer) (1957–2005), best known for his book Thought Contagion: How Belief Spreads Through Society
Aaron Lynch (American football) (born 1993), American football outside linebacker